The 2014 Leinster Senior Football Championship was that year's installment of the annual Leinster Senior Football Championship held under the auspices of Leinster GAA. It was one of the four provincial competitions of the 2014 All-Ireland Senior Football Championship. Dublin entered the competition as defending Leinster champions and ended it the same way.

The draw was made on 3 October 2013.

Teams
The Leinster championship was contested by 11 of the 12 county teams in Leinster, a province of Ireland. Kilkenny was the only county team not to compete.

Bracket

Fixtures

Preliminary round

Quarter-finals

Semi-finals

Final

See also
 Fixtures and results
 2014 All-Ireland Senior Football Championship
 2014 Connacht Senior Football Championship
 2014 Munster Senior Football Championship
 2014 Ulster Senior Football Championship

References

2L
Leinster Senior Football Championship